Óbuda-Békásmegyer is the 3rd district of Budapest, Hungary.

Landmarks
 Aquincum, ruins of the Roman city
 Óbuda Jewish Cemetery
 Római Part (Roman Beach)

History
The military camp, then city of Aquincum, located in part of what later became known as Óbuda, was built there by the Roman Empire. The settlement, which existed from the 1st to the 4th century, had a military and a separate civilian area. It had advanced infrastructure such as an aqueduct, a bath and two amphitheatres, one for the military and one for the civilians. Several villas belonged to the settlement, and the Roman governor had his palace on Hajógyári Island.

Politics 
The current mayor of III. District of Budapest is László Kiss (DK).

The District Assembly, elected at the 2019 local government elections, is made up of 23 members (1 Mayor, 16 Individual constituencies MEPs and 6 Compensation List MEPs) divided into this political parties and alliances:

List of mayors

Twin towns – sister cities
Óbuda-Békásmegyer is twinned with:

 Bemowo (Warsaw), Poland
 Billigheim, Germany
 Büyükçekmece, Turkey
 Miercurea Ciuc, Romania
 Old Town (Košice), Slovakia
 Stirling, Scotland, United Kingdom

Notes

References

External links